The 2009 Dakar Rally was the 31st running of the Dakar Rally. In addition to motorcycle, automobile, and truck categories, a separate quad (all-terrain vehicle) class was added for the first time. The race began on 3 January 2009, and took place across Argentina and Chile. The rally was for the first time to take place outside of Europe and Africa as the location was changed by organizers due to concerns about possible terrorist attacks that resulted in the moving of the 2008 edition from the traditional route to Senegal to Hungary and Romania in the spring .

Étienne Lavigne, the race director of the rally, first announced the new race location in February 2008 around the same time as the replacement Central Europe Rally was held for competitors. He said, "Dakar competitors are going to discover new territory, new scenery, but with the same spirit of competition and adventure, with very hard stages."

Entrants
540 teams from 50 nations are competing in the race. Teams underwent administrative and technical checks in Buenos Aires between 31 December and 2 January. Afterwards, 217 motorcycles, 25 all-terrain vehicle, 177 cars, and 81 trucks driven by a total of 837 people were approved to start.

Route

The race began in Buenos Aires, Argentina with a symbolic start that took place on 2 January in downtown Buenos Aires, attracting an estimated crowd of 500,000 fans. There will be a rest day in Valparaíso, Chile on 10 January. There are ten stages in Argentina, and three in Chile.

Stages

Due to heavy fog and the need to cross the border between Chile and Argentina, the competitive element of Stage 11 was cancelled.

Stage results

Motorcycles

Quads

Cars

Trucks

Trucks did not compete in Stage 7.
The timed part of Stage 11 was cancelled due to bad weather.

Final standings

Bikes

Quads

Cars

Trucks

Accidents
During the first stage of the rally, British driver Paul Green and co-driver Matthew Harrison were seriously injured when their Rally Raid UK car overturned.

On 7 January 49-year-old French motorcycle rider Pascal Terry was found dead in a remote area.  He had been missing since the second stage of the rally, and the cause of death was determined as a pulmonary edema.

On the tenth stage on 13 January 48-year-old Spanish motorcyclist Cristóbal Guerrero was seriously injured after a heavy crash. 24 hours after the accident, he was reportedly still in a coma and in a critical condition. Guerrero's son Cristóbal junior competes in the World Enduro Championship.

During stage twelve of 15 January, rally leader Carlos Sainz rolled his Volkswagen Toureg into a ravine, ending the race for the Spaniard and his French co-pilot, Michel Perin, who received a shoulder injury during the crash.

Notable Drivers

  Nasser Al-Attiyah
  Carlos Sainz
  Giniel De Villiers
  Stéphane Peterhansel
  Luc Alphand
  Dieter Depping
  Robby Gordon
  Eliseo Salazar
  Yvan Muller
  Antanas Juknevičius
  Tom Coronel
  Tim Coronel
  Ukyo Katayama
  Takuma Aoki
  Krzysztof Hołowczyc
  Miki Biasion
  Joan Roma
  Mark Miller
  Alister McRae
  Hiroshi Masuoka
  Eje Elgh

Winners
Spanish rider Marc Coma won his second Dakar Rally in the motorbike class while KTM scored their ninth consecutive win in the event, which also includes the Central Europe Rally in 2008 that KTM had won.

Josef Macháček of the Czech Republic won the quad class driving a Yamaha vehicle. It was the first time in Dakar Rally history that the quad category competition was held in a separate class.

Giniel De Villiers of South Africa and his German co-driver Dirk von Zitzewitz won the car category with Volkswagen. It was their first Dakar Rally victory and Volkswagen's second, the first since 1980.

The Russian Kamaz crew of Firdaus Kabirov, Aydar Belyaev, and Andrey Mokeev won the truck category for their second time with Kamaz scoring their eighth victory and their first since 2006.

References

External links

Dakar Rally 2009 Official site

Dakar Rally
Dakar
Dakar
 Sports competitions in Buenos Aires